Nikolaj Pirnat (10 December 1903, Idrija, Austria-Hungary – 9 January 1948, Ljubljana, Yugoslavia) was a Slovene painter and sculptor.

He was the earliest exponent of social realism in Slovene fine arts, exhibiting his paintings in Ljubljana in 1928.

During World War II, he was imprisoned in the Italian Gonars concentration camp in 1942; a Slovene painting school was established there that year. Some of his drawings of life there survive. After Italy switched sides and joined the Allies, he produced propaganda for the partisans.

He is responsible for the statue of John the Baptist at the center of Trnovo Bridge in Ljubljana.

Some of his works are held in the collections of the Museum of Modern Art, the National Museum of Natural History, both in Ljubljana, and the Maribor Art Gallery. Exhibitions of his work were held beginning in 1976, with the most recent being in 2017, all in Slovenia.

Gallery

References

See also
 Biography at idrija.com

1903 births
1948 deaths
20th-century Slovenian painters
20th-century Slovenian male artists
20th-century Slovenian sculptors
Slovenian male painters
Slovenian sculptors
People from Idrija